Pornchai Saosri (1989 – November 8, 2015) was a Thai man who claimed to be 8 ft 9.9 in (2.69m) but this is not verified by Guinness World Records. He was last measured to be around 8 feet 5.2 inches.

Biography 
Pornchai Saosri made his first appearance in the public news when in 2009 he measured 7 ft 6 in (228cm). He next appeared in 2012 when he measured 7 ft 6.6 in (230cm). His next news recorded appearance was in 2013 when he grew to 8 ft 5.2 in (257cm) which he measured for his id card renewal. Although his claim wasn't recognized by Guinness World Records, he was taller than official record holder Sultan Kösen by 2.2 inches (5.5cm) which made him the tallest living human at the time. He died in 2015 aged 26 of hypertension. By that point, he was claimed to be 8 ft 9.9 in (269cm) and weighed 135 kg which, if true, would make him the 2nd tallest human ever recorded.

Despite the inflation of his height number and the lack of information during his life, he is the 8th tallest person in recorded history.

References 

People with gigantism
Date of birth uncertain
1989 births
2015 deaths
Deaths from hypertension
Pornchai Saosri
Pornchai Saosri